Tiberiu Gabriel Bălan (born 17 February 1981) is a Romanian former international footballer who played as an attacking midfielder and currently a football manager.

Honours

External links

1981 births
Living people
People from Ocna Mureș
Romanian footballers
Romania international footballers
Association football midfielders
Liga I players
Liga II players
FC Universitatea Cluj players
CS Gaz Metan Mediaș players
FC Politehnica Timișoara players
FC Sportul Studențesc București players
FC Rapid București players
FC Unirea Urziceni players
FC Steaua București players
FC Voluntari players
FCV Farul Constanța players
Romanian football managers
CS Pandurii Târgu Jiu managers